Banksia vestita, commonly known as summer dryandra, is a species of shrub that is endemic to the southwest of Western Australia. It has broadly linear, pinnatifid leaves with sharply pointed teeth on both sides, yellow flowers in heads of between thirty and forty, and broadly egg-shaped follicles.

Description
There are between four and twelve sharply-pointed, triangular teeth on each side of the leaves.

Taxonomy

The species was first collected by James Drummond in the 1840s, from a location described simply as "south-western W.A.". Richard Kippist subsequently named and formally described the species, and Kippist's description of Dryandra vestita was published in 1855 by Carl Meissner in Hooker's Journal of Botany and Kew Garden Miscellany. It was given the specific name "vestita" from the Latin vestitus ("clothed"), in reference to the hairy bracts that cover the lower parts of new shoots.

Otto Kuntze transferred Dryandra to Josephia in 1890, republishing D. vestita as Josephia vestita (Kippist ex Meisn.) Kuntze, but his changes were not accepted by the wider scientific community. In 1999, Alex George placed the species in Dryandra subgenus Dryandra, series Gymnocephalae.

Early in 2007, Austin Mast and Kevin Thiele transferred all Dryandra taxa to Banksia, giving this species the name Banksia vestita. As an interim measure, Mast and Thiele placed all but one Dryandra taxon in Banksia ser. Dryandra.

Distribution and habitat
Banksia vestita grows in sand over laterite, amongst heath dominated by species of Proteaceae and Myrtaceae. It occurs from Eneabba in the north to Lake Grace in the south, thus ranging the Geraldton Sandplains, Swan Coastal Plain, Jarrah Forest, Avon Wheatbelt and Mallee biogeographic regions.

Ecology

Like most other Proteaceae, B. vestita has proteoid roots, roots with dense clusters of short lateral rootlets that form a mat in the soil just below the leaf litter. These enhance solubilisation of nutrients, thus allowing nutrient uptake in low-nutrient soils such as the phosphorus-deficient native soils of Australia. It has a lignotuber, so it is able to resprout from below the ground following a bushfire; bushfire also triggers the release of its seed, an adaptation known as serotiny.

An assessment of the potential impact of climate change on this species found that its range is likely to contract by between 30% and 80% by 2080, depending on the severity of the change.

Conservation status
Summer dryandra is classified as "not threatened" by the Western Australian Government Department of Parks and Wildlife.

Use in horticulture
Banksia vestita is not often cultivated, as it is not considered a particularly attractive plant. In cultivation it grows slowly, but is long-lived; specimens at the Royal Botanic Gardens, Cranbourne are still healthy and flowering at twenty years of age. It takes from six to seven weeks to germinate, with a germination success rate of around 70%. It requires a very well drained sandy soil in full sun. It tolerates drought well, is moderately frost-tolerant, and takes pruning well.

References

vestita
Endemic flora of Western Australia
Plants described in 1855
Taxa named by Carl Meissner